Vaida Bay (Vaida Guba) is a body of water on the northwestern coast of the Kola Peninsula, Murmansk Oblast, Russia. 

Bays of the Barents Sea
Bays of Murmansk Oblast